María Amparo Noguera Portales (born March 6, 1965), is a Chilean television, theatre and film actress.

Amparo is the daughter of the actor Héctor Noguera Illanes and Isidora Portales. Her grandfather, Héctor Noguera Prieto was descendant of the former President of Chile José Joaquín Prieto Vial and her mother is descendant of Diego Portales, Chilean politician of Basque descent. Studied acting at Pontificia Universidad Católica de Chile and in Escuela de Teatro Imagen. Her half-sister, Emilia is also an actress.

She is one of the most recognized actresses in Chile. She is best known for the films El Ciclista de San Cristóbal, El País de Octubre and Mi Último Hombre. And won the Altazar Award for best actress thanks to Un Ladrón y su Mujer. In 2009 appeared in the TV serie ¿Dónde está Elisa? as Amanda Goldstein.

Filmography

Film roles

Soap opera roles

TV series roles

Theatre
 Ardiente Paciencia
 Diálogo de Fin de Siglo
 La Manzana de Adán
 Historias de Sangre
 Los Días Tuertos
 Dédalo en el Vientre de la Bestia
 El Paseo de Buster Keaton
 ´´Hechos Consumados´´
 La Gaviota (Melodrama Del Fracaso)
 Numancia
 Infamante Electra
 Casa de Muñecas
 Las Brutas

References

External links
 

1965 births
Chilean television actresses
Chilean film actresses
Chilean telenovela actresses
Chilean people of French descent
Living people
People from Santiago
Pontifical Catholic University of Chile alumni